Dana Randall is an American computer scientist. She works as the ADVANCE Professor of Computing, and adjunct professor of mathematics at the Georgia Institute of Technology.  She is also an External Professor of the Santa Fe Institute. Previously she was executive director of the Georgia Tech Institute of Data Engineering and Science (IDEaS) that she co-founded, and director of the Algorithms and Randomness Center. Her research include combinatorics, computational aspects of statistical mechanics, Monte Carlo stimulation of Markov chains, and randomized algorithms.

Education
Randall was born in Queens, New York. She graduated from New York City's Stuyvesant High School in 1984. She received her A.B. in Mathematics from Harvard University in 1988 and her Ph.D. in computer science from the University of California, Berkeley in 1994 under the supervision of Alistair Sinclair.

Her sister is theoretical physicist Lisa Randall.

Research
Her primary research interest is analyzing algorithms for counting problems (e.g. counting matchings in a graph) using Markov chains. One of her important contributions to this area is a decomposition theorem for analyzing Markov chains.

Accolades
In 2012 she became a fellow of the American Mathematical Society.

She delivered her Arnold Ross Lecture on October 29, 2009, an honor previously conferred on Barry Mazur, Elwyn Berlekamp, Ken Ribet, Manjul Bhargava, David Kelly and Paul Sally.

Publications
Clustering in interfering models of binary mixtures

References

External links
Dana Randall's website
Arnold Ross Lectures details at the AMS

Year of birth missing (living people)
Living people
Georgia Tech faculty
Stuyvesant High School alumni
Harvard University alumni
University of California, Berkeley alumni
Theoretical computer scientists
American women computer scientists
American computer scientists
20th-century American scientists
20th-century American women scientists
21st-century American scientists
21st-century American women scientists
American women academics